Euxoa altens is a moth of the family Noctuidae. It is found from British Columbia, south to Oregon and California.

References 

Euxoa
Moths of North America
Moths described in 1946
Taxa named by James Halliday McDunnough